The Lucien Stryk Asian Translation Prize is a prize that recognizes the best translation into English of book-length texts of Asian poetry or Zen Buddhism. It was established by an anonymous donor in 2010, and is named for Lucien Stryk, the American Zen poet and translator.

The Lucien Stryk Asian Translation Prize is awarded at the same time as the National Translation Award (NTA) in Prose and Poetry, the Italian Prose in Translation Award (IPTA), and the Spain-USA Foundation Translation Award by the American Literary Translators Association (ALTA). These awards are announced and honored at the annual ALTA conference held each fall. The winner receives $6,000.

About the prize
The prize is named after Lucien Stryk, an internationally acclaimed translator of Japanese and Chinese Zen poetry, Zen poet, and former professor of English at Northern Illinois University. Although primarily intended to recognize the translation of contemporary works, re-translations, or first-time translations of important older works, are also considered. Eligible works include book-length translations into English of Asian poetry, or source texts from Zen Buddhism, book-length translations from Hindi, Sanskrit, Tamil, Thai, Kannada, Vietnamese, Chinese, Japanese, and Korean into English. Submitted works must have been published in the previous calendar year.

Winners of the prize

References

Translation awards
Poetry awards
Buddhist literature